Iyang-Argapura or Mount Argopuro is a massive volcanic complex that dominates the landscape between Mount Raung and Mount Lamongan in East Java, Indonesia. Valleys up to 1,000 m deep dissect the strongly eroded Iyang volcano. No historical eruptions have been recorded within the last 500 years, but there is an unverified report about an eruption in AD 1597.

See also 

 List of volcanoes in Indonesia

References 

Mountains of East Java
Volcanoes of East Java
Complex volcanoes